Alfred Obschernikat (14 May 1926 – 15 October 2005) was a German water polo player. He competed in the men's tournament at the 1956 Summer Olympics.

References

1926 births
2005 deaths
German male water polo players
Olympic water polo players of the United Team of Germany
Water polo players at the 1956 Summer Olympics
Sportspeople from Duisburg
20th-century German people